Bostan Rural District may refer to:
 Bostan Rural District (Khuzestan Province)
 Bostan Rural District (Razavi Khorasan Province)